Ptilonyssus echinatus  is a nasal mite found in birds including the pale crag martin.

References 

Rhinonyssidae
Animals described in 1889
Parasitic acari
Parasites of birds